The 1969 All England Championships was a badminton tournament held at Wembley Arena, London, England, from 19–23 March 1969.

Sue Pound married and became Sue Whetnall, Imre Reitveld married and became Imre Nielsen and Muriel Ferguson married and became Muriel Woodcock.

Final results

Men's singles

Section 1

Section 2

+ Denotes seed

Women's singles

Section 1

Section 2

+ seeded player

References

All England Open Badminton Championships
All England
All England Open Badminton Championships in London
All England
All England Badminton Championships
All England Badminton Championships